The 1967 NCAA University Division football season was the last one in which college football's champion was crowned before the bowl games.  During the 20th century, the NCAA had no playoff for the major college football teams in the University Division, later known as Division I-A and now as the Division I Football Bowl Subdivision (FBS).

The NCAA Football Guide, however, did note an "unofficial national champion" based on the top-ranked teams in the "wire service" (AP and UPI) polls.  The "writers' poll" by Associated Press (AP) was the most popular, followed by the "coaches' poll" by United Press International (UPI).  In 1967, both AP and UPI issued their final polls at the close of the regular season, but before teams competed in bowl games.  The Associated Press presented the "AP Trophy" to the winner.

The AP poll in 1967 consisted of the votes of many sportswriters, though not all of them voted in every poll.  Those who cast votes would give their opinion of the ten best teams.  Under a point system of 10 points for first place, 9 for second, etc., the "overall" ranking was determined.

Rule changes
 The five interior linemen in punt formation are now required to remain at the line of scrimmage until the ball is kicked, which allowed for more and longer punt returns. However, the rule was extremely unpopular among coaches and was repealed for the 1968 season.

Conference and program changes

Prior to this season, Idaho and Pacific were demoted to the College Division. After two years, both returned to the University Division in 1969.

September
In the preseason poll released on September 11, first place went to the defending champion Notre Dame Fighting Irish, followed by the No. 2 Alabama Crimson Tide, the No. 3 Michigan State Spartans, No. 4 Texas, and No. 5 Miami.  Pacific-8 (still officially called the AAWU until the following season) teams USC and UCLA were seventh and eighth, and Colorado of the Big 8 was tenth.  Joining Alabama  from the SEC were No. 6 Georgia and No. 9 Tennessee.

September 15–16 The AAWU began its season a week ahead of most other conferences and No. 7 USC beat Washington State 49–0 in a Friday night game at Los Angeles. No. 8 UCLA hosted No. 9 Tennessee and won 20–16.  California beat Oregon 21–13 in advance of its game against No. 1 Notre Dame.  USC reached the Top Five in the next poll, while Miami dropped to eighth before it had played a game. The poll was No. 1 Notre Dame, No. 2 Alabama, No. 3 Michigan State, No. 4 USC, and No. 5 Texas.

September 23 No. 1 Notre Dame hosted California and won 41–8.  At Birmingham, No. 2 Alabama played to a 37–37 tie with Florida State.  No. 3 Michigan State lost at home to the Houston Cougars 37–7, and proved the preseason prognosticators wrong on its way to a 3–7 finish.  The big matchup was in L.A. between No. 4 USC and No. 5 Texas, and the Trojans won 17–13.  No. 6 UCLA beat the Panthers at Pittsburgh 40–8 and No. 7 Georgia won 30–0 at home over Mississippi State. The next poll was No. 1 Notre Dame, No. 2 USC, No. 3 Houston, No. 4 UCLA, and No. 5 Georgia.

Saturday's games also saw a milestone in the integration of college sports in the South, as Kentucky's Nate Northington became the first African-American scholarship athlete to participate in any Southeastern Conference sport when he made his debut at Indiana. His debut was bittersweet, as it came while Greg Page, another African-American player who had arrived at Kentucky at the same time as Northington, was dying from complications of a paralyzing spinal cord injury suffered in an August 22 practice. Page would die on the Friday after Northington's debut.

September 29–30 In a Friday night game, No. 3 Houston rolled over Wake Forest at home, 50–6.  On Saturday, No. 1 Notre Dame lost 28–21 at No. 10 Purdue, and No. 2 USC won 21–17 at Michigan State. No. 4 UCLA trampled Washington State in Spokane, 51–23, and No. 5 Georgia won at Clemson, 24–17.  Notre Dame fell from the Top 5 in the next poll and USC took the lead, followed by No. 2 Houston, No. 3 UCLA, No. 4 Purdue, and No. 5 Georgia.

In another integration-related milestone, the aforementioned Northington became the first African-American scholarship athlete to play in a matchup between two SEC teams when he took the field against Ole Miss that Saturday, the day after Page's death. Northington would suffer a separated shoulder shortly after entering the game, and never played again for the Wildcats, transferring to Western Kentucky after the season.

October
October 7 Top-ranked USC beat Stanford at home, 30–0.  The No. 2 Houston Cougars, who had come from nowhere to reach a lofty ranking, lost at home to unranked North Carolina State, 16–6.  No. 3 UCLA edged Penn State 17–15.  In a Big Ten matchup, No. 4 Purdue beat Northwestern 25–16, and No. 5 Georgia shut out South Carolina at home, 21–0.  In South Bend, No. 6 Notre Dame crushed Iowa 56–6 to return to the Top Five as it prepared to face USC.  The next poll was No. 1 USC, No. 2 Purdue, No. 3 Georgia, No. 4 UCLA, and No. 5 Notre Dame.

October 14 The No. 1 USC Trojans visited No. 5 Notre Dame and won 24–7, and No. 2 Purdue won at Ohio State 41–6.  No. 3 Georgia lost to Ole Miss at Jackson, 29–20. No. 4 UCLA beat California at home, 37–14.  Taking the place of the Irish and Georgia in the Top Five were No. 6 Colorado, which had beaten Missouri 23–9, and No. 9 N.C. State, which won at Maryland 31–9. The poll was No. 1 USC, No. 2 Purdue, No. 3 UCLA, No. 4 Colorado, and No. 5 North Carolina State.

October 21 Top-ranked USC beat Washington in Seattle, 23–6, for its sixth straight win.  The Trojans' cross-town rival, No. 3 UCLA, was also 6–0, beating Stanford in Palo Alto, 21–16.  No. 2 Purdue lost its first game of the season, falling to visiting Oregon State, 22–14.  No. 4 Colorado won at Nebraska 21–16, and No. 5 N.C. State hosted Wake Forest and won 24–7. No. 6 Alabama and No. 7 Tennessee squared off in Birmingham and Tennessee won 24–13, a result that would eventually deliver the SEC championship to the Volunteers.  In the next poll, USC was the unanimous choice for No. 1, with all 37 first place votes.  The other top teams were No. 2 UCLA, No. 3 Colorado, No. 4 Tennessee, and No. 5 N.C. State.

October 28 USC stayed atop the polls, defeating Oregon 28–6 at home, while No. 2 UCLA was idle.  No. 3 Colorado lost to visiting Oklahoma State 10–7.  No. 4 Tennessee narrowly beat LSU at home, 17–14, and No. 5 N.C. State beat Duke 28–7.  Replacing Colorado in the Top Five was No. 6 Georgia, which won 31–7 at Kentucky.  The poll: No. 1 USC, No. 2 UCLA, No. 3 Tennessee, No. 4 N.C. State, and No. 5 Georgia.

November
November 4 Top-ranked USC beat California at Berkeley, 31–12, to extend its record to 8–0, and No. 2 UCLA stayed unbeaten but was tied by visiting Oregon State, 16–16.  No. 3 Tennessee visited Tampa and beat the Spartans, 38–0.  No. 4 N.C. State won at Virginia 30–8, and the No. 5 Georgia Bulldogs narrowly lost at Houston 15–14.  No. 6 Purdue won at Illinois 42–9. The next poll was No. 1 USC, No. 2 Tennessee, No. 3 N.C. State, No. 4 UCLA, and No. 5 Purdue.

November 11 Top-ranked USC finally lost, falling 3–0 in the rain and mud at Corvallis to Oregon State. No. 2 Tennessee beat Tulane 35–14. No. 3 N.C. State lost at Penn State 13–8.  No. 4 UCLA shut out visiting Washington, 48–0, and No. 5 Purdue beat Minnesota 41–12. Their Big Ten rival, No. 6 Indiana, won at Michigan State 14–13. UCLA took USC's place at the top, leapfrogging Tennessee, whom the Bruins had beaten earlier in the year. The other top teams were No. 3 Purdue, No. 4 USC, and No. 5 Indiana.

November 18 In Los Angeles, the No. 1 UCLA Bruins and the No. 4 USC Trojans met at the Coliseum for their rivalry game, with a Pac-8 title, a Rose Bowl berth, and possibly the national championship on the line.  USC reclaimed its place at the top, edging UCLA 21–20.  No. 2 Tennessee faced Mississippi in Memphis and won 20–7. No. 3 Purdue beat Michigan State 21–7, but No. 5 Indiana lost to Minnesota 33–7.  No. 7 Oklahoma, which had gone on a winning streak after an early loss to Texas in the Red River Showdown, beat Kansas 14–10 at home to clinch the Big 8 championship and a spot in the Orange Bowl. The next poll was No. 1 USC, No. 2 Tennessee, No. 3 Purdue, No. 4 UCLA, and No. 5 Oklahoma.

November 25 In the final week of games before the final polls, No. 1 USC had already completed its season at 9–1.  No. 2 Tennessee won at Kentucky 17–7 to clinch the SEC title; the Vols opted to play Oklahoma in the Orange Bowl rather than heading to the Sugar Bowl. Indiana had fallen out of the Top Ten, but made their way back in when they beat No. 3 Purdue at home in Bloomington, 19–14.  There was a three-way tie in Big Ten Conference play.  Not only were Indiana, Purdue, and Minnesota each 6–1, but Indiana beat Purdue, Purdue beat Minnesota, and Minnesota beat Indiana.  The Hoosiers had the better overall record (9–1 vs. 8–2 and 8–2), and since Purdue and Minnesota had been to the Rose Bowl more recently, Indiana qualified for the Rose Bowl. No. 4 UCLA, without injured Heisman Trophy winner Gary Beban and little motivation after their loss to USC the week before, lost a meaningless game to Syracuse 32–14, and No. 5 Oklahoma beat Nebraska 21–14.  No. 6 Notre Dame, which had won a Friday night game at Miami, 24–22, returned to the top five with unranked Indiana.  In the final poll, USC was tops in both the AP and UPI polls, and was awarded the AP Trophy. 

The final regular season poll featured No. 1 USC, No. 2 Tennessee, No. 3 Oklahoma, No. 4 Indiana, and No. 5 Notre Dame. No. 6 Wyoming was the only major team to go unbeaten (10–0), and the Cowboys prepared to play LSU in the Sugar Bowl. No. 7 Oregon State had played three teams that were ranked 1st or 2nd when they played them (UCLA, USC, and Purdue) and went 2–0–1 in those games, but their 13–6 loss to Washington on October 7 kept the "Giant Killers" out of the Rose Bowl. The poll was rounded out by No. 8 Alabama, No. 9 Purdue, and No. 10 Penn State.

A few more games were played after the final poll, but none of them resulted in losses for ranked teams. On December 2, No. 2 Tennessee defeated Vanderbilt 41−14, while the Vols' Orange Bowl opponent, No. 3 Oklahoma, won 38–14 over Oklahoma State. No. 8 Alabama played Auburn in its annual game at Birmingham, won 7–3, and prepared to face SWC champion Texas A&M in the Cotton Bowl.

Conference standings

Bowl games

Major bowls
Monday, January 1, 1968

In the final AP poll, 9–1 USC had been the top choice of the writers for the AP Trophy, with 36 of the 49 first place votes, and Tennessee followed with 11.  Though there was no No. 1 vs. No. 2 matchup, the Rose and Orange bowls featured the four top-ranked teams, with No. 1 USC meeting No. 4 Indiana at Pasadena, and No. 2 Tennessee facing No. 3 Oklahoma at Miami.  The Sugar Bowl, at that time, did not automatically get the SEC champion.  Ultimately, the New Orleans game featured the Wyoming Cowboys (10–0) of the Western Athletic Conference, against the LSU Tigers.  LSU had finished sixth in the ten-team SEC, behind Tennessee, Alabama, Florida, Mississippi, and Georgia. But LSU justified their selection by knocking off Wyoming, . In the Cotton Bowl, unranked Texas A&M upset No. 8 Alabama 20–16. USC then went out and claimed the national title with a 14–3 over Indiana in the Rose Bowl. Effectively eliminated from finishing No. 1 after USC's win, No. 2 Tennessee went out and lost in the Orange Bowl to No. 3 Oklahoma, 26–24.

Other bowls

 Prior to the 1975 season, the Big Ten and Pac-8 conferences allowed only one postseason participant each, for the Rose Bowl.
 Notre Dame did not play in the postseason for 44 consecutive seasons (1925–1968).

Awards and honors

Heisman Trophy voting
The Heisman Trophy is given to the year's most outstanding player

Source:

All-Americans

1967 Consensus All-America Team

Offense

Defense

Statistical leaders
Player scoring most points: Leroy Keyes, Purdue, 114.

See also
1967 NCAA University Division football rankings
1967 College Football All-America Team
1967 USC vs. UCLA football game

Footnotes

References